Stray is the fourth album by Scottish group Aztec Camera, released in June 1990 on WEA in the UK and on Sire Records in the US.

Stray was praised for its diversity of songs and styles, and for the assured nature of Roddy Frame's lyrics (which had been considered the weak-point of some of his earlier material).  Its understated production was also received positively, particularly coming after the group's previous album Love, which sold well in the United Kingdom but had been criticised by some for being too sanitised and glossy.

Stray peaked at No. 22 in the UK Albums Chart.  The single "Good Morning Britain", a collaboration with Mick Jones, reached No. 19 in the UK Singles Chart.

Critical reception
In a 2013 review of Aztec Camera reissues, Uncut called Stray "the most inventive and durable Aztec Camera LP. Diverse, yes, but it’s exhilarating to hear Frame switching-up from plaintive balladry ('Over My Head') to the BAD-influenced 'Good Morning Britain.'" The Rolling Stone Album Guide called the album "leaner and more melodic" and praised the "fine jazz-inflected numbers."

Track listing
All tracks written by Roddy Frame.
 "Stray" 5:34
 "The Crying Scene" 3:34
 "Get Outta London" 3:41
 "Over My Head" 5:53
 "Good Morning Britain" 4:02
 "How It Is" 4:00
 "The Gentle Kind" 5:32
 "Notting Hill Blues" 6:41
 "Song for a Friend" 2:27

Singles
"The Crying Scene" (UK No. 70)
"Good Morning Britain" (UK No. 19)

Personnel
Roddy Frame – guitars, vocals
Gary Sanctuary – keyboards
Paul Powell – bass guitar
Frank Tontoh – drums

References

Aztec Camera albums
1990 albums
Sire Records albums